Tarshabur (also Romanized as Tarshābūr; also known as Torshābūr-e Ţūlārūd-e Bālā) is a village in Tula Rud Rural District, in the Central District of Talesh County, Gilan Province, Iran. At the 2006 census, its population was 1,675, in 404 families.

References 

Populated places in Talesh County